Avalon Sutra / As Long As I Can Hold My Breath is a double album by Harold Budd. The first disc is titled Avalon Sutra, and the second, a remix from Akira Rabelais, is titled As Long as I Can Hold My Breath. At the time of its release in 2005, it was reported to be his final musical work.  However, both Music for 'Fragments from the Inside' and Mysterious Skin - Music from the Film, a collaboration with Robin Guthrie, were released a few months after this album.  Further recordings were to follow with the last, "Another Flower" (with Robin Guthrie)  recorded in 2013 but only released a few days before his death in December 2020.

Track listing
CD 1 Avalon Sutra

 "Arabesque 3" (Jon Gibson) – 2:40
 "It's Steeper near the Roses (For David Sylvian)" – 1:02
 "L'enfant Perdu" – 2:14
 "Chrysalis Nu (To Barney's Memory)" – 1:59
 "Three Faces West (Billy Al Bengston's)" – 2:49
 "Arabesque 2" (Jon Gibson) 3:02
 "Little Heart" – 7:40
 "How Vacantly You Stare at Me" (Jon Gibson) 4:01
 "A Walk in the Park with Nancy (In Memory)" – 5:55
 "Rue Casimir Delavigne (For Daniel Lentz)" – 5:28
 "Arabesque 1" (Jon Gibson) 1:56
 "Porcelain Ginger" – 2:01
 "Faraon" – 1:23
 "As Long as I Can Hold My Breath" – 3:57

CD 2 As Long As I Can Hold My Breath

 "As Long As I Can Hold My Breath (by Night)" – 69:28

Personnel
Harold Budd - string arrangements, mixing, keyboards
Marston Smith - cello (2, 3, 4, 5)
Peter Kent - violin (2, 3, 4, 5)
James Acevedo - viola (2,3,4,5)
Denis Blackham - mastering
Michael Coleman - mixing, mastering, recording (1, 14)
Yuka Fujii - artist Liaison
Shinya Fujiwara - photography
Scott Fraser - recording (1, 2, 3, 4, 6, 8, 11)
James Sitterly - violin (2, 3, 4, 5)
Akira Rabelais - composer, guitar (As Long As I Can Hold My Breath (by Night))
David Sylvian - art director
Chris Bigg - design

References 

Harold Budd albums
2005 albums
Samadhi Sound albums
Ambient albums by American artists